Cassida morondaviana is a species of leaf beetle, situated in the subfamily Cassidinae (tortoise beetles) and the genus Cassida. It was described as a new species in 2007 from specimens collected in Madagascar in 2004. It is named after its type locality of the city of Morondava.

References

Cassidinae
Beetles of Africa
Beetles described in 2007